Eisenlohr is a surname. Notable people with the surname include:

August Eisenlohr (1832–1902), German Egyptologist
Friedrich Eisenlohr (1805–1854), German architect and university professor
Ulrich Eisenlohr (born 1950), German classical pianist

See also 
Eisenlohr–Bayuk Tobacco Historic District, historic tobacco warehouse complex and national historic district located at Lancaster, Lancaster County, Pennsylvania